Quirine Lemoine was the defending champion but lost in the semifinals to Simona Waltert.

Waltert went on to win the title, defeating Emma Navarro in the final, 7–6(12–10), 6–0.

Seeds

Draw

Finals

Top half

Bottom half

References

External Links
Main Draw

Amstelveen Women's Open - Singles